Nikolai Myaskovsky wrote his Symphony No. 8 in A major, his Opus 26, between 1924 and 1925.

The symphony is his second in the major - the first is his fifth symphony - and the premiere was conducted by Konstantin Saradzhev, who had premiered the composer's fourth and seventh symphonies.  It is dedicated to Sergei S. Popov.

It is in four movements:
 Andante - Allegro in F minor and A major
 Allegro risoluto e con spirito in D major
 Adagio in B minor
 Allegro deciso in A major

Recordings

Robert Stankovsky with the Czecho-Slovak Radio Symphony Orchestra of Bratislava on Marco Polo Records 8.223297, 1991.
Evgeny Svetlanov with the Russian Federation Academic Symphony Orchestra on Alto, also released on Warner.

Sources

08
1925 compositions
Compositions in A major